Cristina Campo was the pen name of Vittoria Maria Angelica Marcella Cristina Guerrini (Bologna, April 29, 1923 – Rome, January 10, 1977), Italian writer, poet, and translator. She published under the pseudonyms Puccio Quaratesi, Bernardo Trevisano, Giusto Cabianca and Benedetto P. d'Angelo.

The daughter of musician and composer  and Emilia Putti, she was born in Bologna and grew up in Florence. Due to a congenital cardiac malformation, which always made her health fragile, Cristina grew up isolated from her peers and could not follow regular school studies. She translated into Italian works by authors such as Katherine Mansfield, Virginia Woolf, Eduard Mörike, William Carlos Williams, John Donne, with a particular dedication to the translations of Hugo von Hofmannsthal and Simone Weil, whose work she introduced to the italian public. She began to attend the salon of Anna Banti in Florence.

In 1955, she moved to Rome which marked a major change in her life. In 1956, she published a poetry collection Passo d'addio. From 1956 to 1961, she wrote a number of scripts for the Italian national radio system RAI. In Rome, she met Elémire Zolla. They both were members of the group "La voce", which was opposed to liturgical changes introduced in the Catholic church by the Second Vatican Council. Together, they edited the 1963 anthology I mistici dell'Occidente. Her mother died in 1964 and her father died the following year. She was so disturbed by these events that she left her home and moved first into a pension and then, in 1968, to an apartment. She died in Rome of a heart attack at the age of 53.

Her poetry and translations were later collected in La tigre assenza, first published in 1991. In 2020, the Nexus Institute published "The Unforgivables", an English translation of Campo's essay "Gli imperdonabili" by Will Schutt. In 2021, an annotated translation of "Gli imperdonabili" by Nicola Masciandaro and Andrea di Serego Alighieri was published in Glossator 11, Practice and Theory of the Commentary, a bilingual volume wholly dedicated to the work of the poet.

References 

1923 births
1977 deaths
Italian women poets
20th-century Italian translators
20th-century Italian women writers